Upper Kohistan District (Kohistani) is a district in Hazara Division of Khyber Pakhtunkhwa province in Pakistan.

Overview and history 
In 2014, the government bifurcated Kohistan District into two districts namely Upper Kohistan and Lower Kohistan.

Demographics 
At the time of the 2017 census the district had a population of 307,286, of which 166,774 were males and 140,504 females. The entire population was rural. 24 people in the district were from religious minorities.

97.95% of the population belongs to Dardic peoples speaking one of the many Kohistani languages as their first language.

Administrative Units
In 2014, Upper Kohistan District is subdivided into two Tehsils while on 31 May 2018, Kundai was upgraded into subdivision and two more tehsils were created. With that change, the district has one subdivision and three tehsils in total as shown below:

Dassu (district capital)
Kandia (subdivision)
Seo (also spell as Suo)
Urban Basha (also spell as Harban)

Provincial Assembly

See also 

 Lower Kohistan
 Kolai Pallas
 Districts of Khyber Pakhtunkhwa

References

 
 
Districts of Khyber Pakhtunkhwa